Kay Tan from the National University of Singapore, Singapore was named Fellow of the Institute of Electrical and Electronics Engineers (IEEE) in 2014 for contributions to evolutionary multiobjective optimization.

References

Fellow Members of the IEEE
Academic staff of the National University of Singapore
Living people
Year of birth missing (living people)
Place of birth missing (living people)